Matt Shakman is an American film, television, and theatre director, and former child actor.  He produced and directed WandaVision and has directed episodes of The Great, It's Always Sunny in Philadelphia, Fargo and Game of Thrones. He is the artistic director of the Geffen Playhouse in Los Angeles, California.

Early life
Shakman was born and raised in Ventura, California. His Jewish father and Catholic mother maintained a "relatively secular household", their interfaith marriage being a source of conflict with Shakman's Jewish paternal grandmother. After acting as a child, starting with commercials and landing a series regular role on Just the Ten of Us, he stepped away to attend The Thacher School in Ojai.

Shakman went on to attend Yale University where he graduated with an art history and theater double major. It was at Yale where Shakman became interested in theatre, going on to direct a number of stage productions.

After university, Shakman lived in New York City for several years before permanently moving to Los Angeles.  He married Maggie Malone in 2012. In 2016, they had a daughter named Maisie.

Career
As a child actor, Shakman played Graham "J.R." Lubbock, Jr. in the Growing Pains spin-off series Just the Ten of Us (1988–1990). His other television acting credits include The Facts of Life, Highway to Heaven, Diff'rent Strokes, Night Court, Good Morning, Miss Bliss and Webster. He also appeared in the films A Night at the Magic Castle (1988), and Meet the Hollowheads (1989).

Shakman is the founder and Artistic Director of the Black Dahlia Theatre (BDT) in Los Angeles, which was named one of "a dozen young American companies you need to know" by American Theatre Magazine.

Since 2002, Shakman has mostly been directing for television. Among his credits include Succession, Mad Men, Six Feet Under, The Boys, The Great, House M.D., Fargo, and It's Always Sunny in Philadelphia (also executive producer).

Shakman directed the episodes "The Spoils of War" and "Eastwatch" for the seventh season of the HBO series Game of Thrones in 2017. In August of the same year, Shakman was appointed as the new artistic director of the Geffen Playhouse in Los Angeles.

In 2017, TriStar Pictures announced that Shakman would direct its upcoming "live-action/hybrid" film adaptation of The Phantom Tollbooth.

In 2021, Shakman directed and executive produced the Marvel Studios miniseries WandaVision for Disney+. Later that year, it was revealed that Shakman would direct a film in the Star Trek franchise. In late August 2022, Shakman was in early talks to direct the Marvel Studios film Fantastic Four, set to release in 2025, replacing Jon Watts who exited the project to take a break from superhero films. On August 26, 2022, Shakman exited the Star Trek film, citing "scheduling issues".

Directing credits

Films
 Cut Bank (2014)
 Fantastic Four (2025)

Television

Theatre
 Wait Until Dark at Geffen Playhouse (2013)
 Bad Jews at Geffen Playhouse (2015)
 Good People at Geffen Playhouse
 Secrets of the Trade at Primary Stages
 Den of Thieves (2002)
 The Last Days of Judas Iscariot (2007)
 Placement (by Blair Singer)

Awards and nominations
 2021: Emmy Award (nomination)—Limited Series Direction, WandaVision
 2021: Emmy Award (nomination)—Limited Series, WandaVision
 2021: Directors Guild of America (nomination)—TV Film/Limited Series, WandaVision
 2020: Emmy Award (nomination)—Comedy Series Direction, The Great, "The Great (Pilot)"
 2018: Directors Guild of America (nomination)—Dramatic Series, Game of Thrones, "The Spoils of War"
 2012: L.A. Drama Critics Circle Milton Katselas Award for Career or Special Achievement in Direction
 2012: LA Weekly Award (nomination) - Direction of a Musical
 2011: L.A. Drama Critics Circle Award (nomination)-Direction
 2009: Garland Award, Direction
 2008: Ovation Award, Direction
 2008: GLAAD Award, LA Production
 2005: L.A. Drama Critics Circle Award for Direction
 2004: Ovation Award (nomination)-Direction
 2002: Garland Award for Direction
 2002: L.A. Weekly Award (nomination) - Direction
 1989: Young Artist Awards – Best Young Actor/Actress Ensemble in a Television Comedy, Drama Series or Special

References

External links
 

20th-century American male actors
American male child actors
American male film actors
American male television actors
American television directors
American theatre directors
Film directors from California
American Jews
Living people
Male actors from California
People from Ventura, California
The Thacher School alumni
Yale University alumni
Year of birth missing (living people)